The Russian blue potato is a deep purple cultivar of potato believed to have originated in Russia.

Characteristics 
The Russian blue potato plant produces medium round and oblong tubers with deep purple insides. It is a late season variety of potato. The plants themselves are large, semi-erect, and produce light blue flowers and dark foliage.

Development 
Russian blues are believed to have originated before the 1900s.

Cooking 
Russian blues are rich in anthocyanin, vitamin C, potassium, and fiber. The potatoes retain their colour when cooked and have a similar texture to russet potatoes.

References 

Potato cultivars